Ava of Ribagorza (Catalan: Ribagorça) (fl. 988), was countess consort of Castile by marriage to García Fernández of Castile.

She was born to Count Raymond I of Pallars and Ribagorza, and Garsenda Fesenzac. She married García Fernández of Castile, with whom she had several children. She participated with her spouse in several donations to various convents.

Ava has been the subject of several legends that depict her in a negative light, and pointed out as involved in several of the conflicts and rebellions which occurred in Castile during the reign of her spouse. One known legend, named la llegenda de la comtessa traïdora ('The Legend of the Traitorous Countess'), she betrayed García Fernández, who was taken captured in a raid by the Moors and killed, after having committed adultery with Al-Aziz Billah. Legend also accuse her of having encouraged her son Sancho in his rebellion against his father. The legends can probably be contributed to hostility to her as a foreigner in Castile: she is also identified as the leader of a more pacifist line at court, in opposition to the military line of her spouse against the Moors, which could also account for her bad publicity.

According to the legend, after the death of her spouse, she attempted to poison his successor and her son by handing him a cup of poison, because she wished to marry Al-Aziz Billah; he, however, forced her to drink it herself, which resulted in her death. The date of her death is in fact unknown: it is only known, that the year of 988 is the last year in which she can be confirmed alive.

Issue
 Mayor García, married Raymond III, count of Pallars Jussà
 Sancho García, count of Castile and Álava
 Urraca García entered the monastery of Infantado de Covarrubias
 Gonzalo García (died 979), speculated to have been ancestor of the House of Lara
 Elvira García, married in 991 to Bermudo II of León
 Toda García, married Sancho Gómez of Saldaña
 Oneca García, married in 995 Almanzor, chamberlain of Cordoba

References
 «Diccionari Biogràfic de Dones: Ava de Ribagorça»
 Abadal i de Vinyals, Ramon d' (1955). Els comtats de Pallars i Ribagorça. Barcelona: Institut d'Estudis Catalans.

10th-century people from the Kingdom of León
Year of birth missing
Year of death missing
Spanish countesses
10th-century Spanish women